Datang Station  is a station of Line 3 of the Guangzhou Metro that started operations on 28December 2006. It is located underground Datang Village along East Xinjiao Road in Haizhu District. It is near the Taxation Bureau of Haizhu district and the Tianxiong Cloth Market Center, as well as to the north of Haizhu Lake.

Station layout

Exits

References

Railway stations in China opened in 2006
Guangzhou Metro stations in Haizhu District